USS Caspian (ID-1380) was the proposed name and hull classification for a tug that never actually served in the United States Navy.

SS Caspian was a steel-hulled commercial tug built in 1912 by John Dialogue and Son at Camden, New Jersey. In early March 1918, the Commandant of the US Navy's 4th Naval District ordered that she be taken over for World War I service. The Navy assigned her the hull classification ID-1380 in anticipation of commissioning her as USS Caspian. However, the Navy never took possession of her, and she remained in civilian service with her owner, P. F. Martin of Philadelphia, Pennsylvania.

References

Cancelled ships of the United States Navy
Ships built by Dialogue & Company
1912 ships
World War I merchant ships of the United States
Tugboats of the United States